, commonly abbreviated as , is a Japanese idol girl group. Their single "Maijene!" reached the fourth place on the weekly Oricon Singles Chart.

On February 3, 2021, their first sister group, YumeAdo Europe (stylized as YUMEADO EUROPE), was announced. The group made their "pre-debut" on February 27. Their official debut was on April 10, and their first single, "Here we go and go!/Shakin’&Movin’", was released on August 10.

A second sister group, composed of junior idols and produced in association with the fashion magazine , YumeAdo Citron (stylized as YUMEADO CiTRON), was announced along with its members on July 9, 2021. They made their stage debut on the eve of the main group's 9th anniversary, on August 21.

A third sister group, composed of virtual YouTubers, was announced on August 21 as well. Their YouTube channel opened on November 8.

Members

Yumemiru Adolescence 
 Julia Narumi (leader, 2019-current)
Seira Hibiya (2020-current)
Chihiro Sakurano (2022-current)
Remon Fujishiro (2022-current)
Maaya Hiragi (2022-current)
Nanaha Sekine (2022-current)
Reina Adachi (2022-current)
Mana Mogami (2022-current)

Past members
Misaki Oka (2012-2013)
Akari Yamada (2012-2017)
Kyōka (2012-2019)
Karin Ogino (ex-leader; 2012-2019)
Yuumi Shida (2012-2019)
Rei Kobayashi (2012-2016; 2017-2019)
Yuki Minase (2017-2019)
Ayaka Tachibana (2020-2021)
Akino Ishimori (2020-2021)
Saya Yamashita (2017-2021)
 Hanon Yamaguchi (ex-leader, 2017-2021)
Ranju Shirakawa (2019-2021)
Karen Marikawa (2020-2021)

Timeline

YumeAdo Europe 

 Yui Miyamoto (2021-current)
 Yukino Funato (2021-current)
Rin Kojima (2021-current)
Juri Matsushima (2022-current)
Ena Mizusawa (2022-current)
Yuna Izumi (2022-current)

Past members 

 Honoka Minami ( Roman Purple, 2021)
 Ayu Yamama (2021-2022)
 Himari Kiyonaga (2021-2022)
 Chinatsu Shiraiwa (2021-2022)
 Nagisa Shiose (2021-2022)
 Yukari Fukuda (2021-2022)

Timeline

YumeAdo Citron 

 Yuna Seto (2021-current)
 Saki Kudō (2021-current)
 Mio Kitajima (2021-current)
 Karen Sasuga (2021-current)
 Yui Kōzuki (2021-current)
 Rei Inagawa (2021-current)
 Yuyu Nakai (2021-current)

Timeline

YumeAdo Vanquish 

 Raise Aikawa (leader, 2021-current)
 Mirin Ichijo (2021-current)
 Neo Kagura (2021-current)
 Emiri Kuramoto (2021-current)
 Yoi Natsumori (2021-current)
 Himari Miyazono (2021-current)

Timeline

Discography

Yumemiru Adolescence

Studio albums

Mini-albums

Compilation albums

Singles

Video works

YumeAdo Europe

Singles

Filmography

Yumemiru Adolescence

Films

Television

Website

Radio

YumeAdo Europe

Television

Website

Radio

References

External links
 

Japanese girl groups
Japanese idol groups
Musical groups established in 2012
2012 establishments in Japan